Frauenkrimipreis der Stadt Wiesbaden was a literary prize of Hesse awarded to female writers until 2006.

Winners 

 2000 Petra Hammesfahr for Die Mutter
 2001 Susanne Mischke for Wer nicht hören will, muß fühlen

 2002 Martina Borger and Maria Elisabeth Straub for Kleine Schwester
 2002 Irmtraut Karlsson for Mord am Ring
 2003 Ramona Diefenbach for Schneckenspur
 2004 Verena Wyss for Die Gärtnerin
 2005 Sabine Deitmer for Scharfe Stiche

Literary awards of Hesse